Límbert Percy Pizarro Vaca (born July 17, 1976 in Santa Cruz de la Sierra) is a Bolivian retired football midfielder.

Club career
Pizarro began playing professionally with traditional club Bolívar, where he spent ten years of his career. During the winter of 2005 he was loaned to Argentine team Tiro Federal, but returned to his club of origin after a spell nearly unnoticed in the Argentine First Division. In 2006, he transferred to San José and began playing consistently again.

International career
Between 2004 and 2007, Pizarro was capped in the Bolivia national team in 9 games. He represented his country in 4 FIFA World Cup qualification matches.

Honours

References

External links
 
 
 Argentine Primera statistics at futbolxxi.com 

1976 births
Living people
Sportspeople from Santa Cruz de la Sierra
Association football midfielders
Bolivian footballers
Bolivia international footballers
Club Bolívar players
Tiro Federal footballers
Club San José players
Bolivian expatriate footballers
Expatriate footballers in Argentina